BK Höllviken is a Swedish football club located in Höllviken, Skåne. The club was founded as Höllvikens GIF in 1933 and it was the name of the club until 7 December 2011, when they changed it to FC Höllviken.

Background
Since their foundation on 4 October 1933 BK Höllviken has participated mainly in the middle and lower divisions of the Swedish football league system.  The club currently plays in Division 3  which is the sixth tier of Swedish football. The club previously had two senior teams called FC Höllviken (in Division 1) and BK Höllviken (in Division 3). After the 2016 season FC Höllviken was dissolved.  They play their home matches at Höllvikens IP.

BK Höllviken are affiliated to the Skånes Fotbollförbund.

Season to season

Footnotes

External links
 Höllvikens GIF – Official website

Sport in Skåne County
Football clubs in Skåne County
Association football clubs established in 1933
1933 establishments in Sweden